Hemant Gurung is a Bhutanese politician who has been a member of the National Assembly of Bhutan, since October 2018. Previously, he was a member of the National Assembly of Bhutan from 2008 to 2013.

Education 
He earned a Bachelor of Arts degree from Jawaharlal Nehru University, India.

Political career 
Gurung was elected to the National Assembly of Bhutan as a candidate of Druk Phuensum Tshogpa (DPT) from Lhamoi Dzingkha Tashiding constituency in 2008 Bhutanese National Assembly election.

He later left DPT to join Druk Nyamrup Tshogpa and was elected for the second time to the National Assembly of Bhutan from Constituency Lhamoi Dzingkha Tashiding in 2018 Bhutanese National Assembly election. He received 6,257 votes, defeating Prem Kumar Khatiwara, a candidate of DPT.

References 

1958 births
Living people
Bhutanese people of Nepalese descent
Jawaharlal Nehru University alumni
Druk Nyamrup Tshogpa politicians
Bhutanese MNAs 2018–2023
Bhutanese MNAs 2008–2013
Druk Nyamrup Tshogpa MNAs